Renan Felipe Boufleur (born January 4, 1990) is a Brazilian footballer.

Career

Early career
Boufleur began his professional career with Santos FC of the Brazilian Serie A before signing as a youth player for R.S.C. Anderlecht in 2009. While with Anderlecht Baufleur was loaned out to Royale Union Saint-Gilloise for two seasons of the Belgian Third Division B.

Phoenix
On 5 February 2012 it was announced that Boufleur had signed with new USL Pro expansion franchise Phoenix FC. Then on 23 March 2013 Boufleur made his debut for the team in the team's very first game against Los Angeles Blues in which the team lost 2–0.

Career statistics

Club
Statistics accurate as of 24 March 2013

References

1990 births
Living people
Sportspeople from Santa Catarina (state)
Brazilian footballers
Brazilian expatriate footballers
Association football midfielders
R.S.C. Anderlecht players
Phoenix FC players
Orlando City SC (2010–2014) players
Expatriate footballers in Belgium
Expatriate soccer players in the United States
USL Championship players